Ahn So-hee (born June 27, 1992), better known by the mononym Sohee, is a South Korean actress and singer. As a singer, she is best known as a former member of the South Korean girl group Wonder Girls. As an actress, she is best known for her performance in the film Train to Busan (2016).

Early life
Ahn So-hee was born on June 27, 1992, in South Korea. She was selected through auditions and, at the age of 12, she became a JYP Entertainment (JYPE) trainee.

Career

2007–2013: Wonder Girls
In 2007, she was revealed as a third member of Wonder Girls, a girl group managed by JYP Entertainment, after two years of training. The group debuted with the single "Irony", featuring Sohee as a dancer and vocalist with the group. The group quickly rose to stardom with their hits "Tell Me", "So Hot" and "Nobody" in less than two years from their debut. Ahn was nicknamed "Nation's Little Sister" by the media.

Ahn's career with JYPE and Wonder Girls came to an end in December 2013, when her contract with the company expired and she decided not to renew.

Acting career and other activities
Ahn made her acting debut at the age of 12 with a minor role in a short film The Synesthesia For Overtone Construction directed by Yu Dae-eol in 2004, where Ahn portrayed a deaf girl.

In early 2008, Ahn made her big screen debut alongside Lee Mi-sook and Kim Min-hee in the romantic comedy Hellcats, directed by Kwon Chil-in of Singles. The film is adapted from the popular Korean comic 10, 20 and 30, and is about the views of modern Korean women towards love and life.

In 2013, Ahn landed first leading role in Happy! Rose Day alongside Jung Woong-in, a drama about a girl in her early 20s who works at a flower shop.

In 2014, Ahn signed a contract with the management agency BH Entertainment. The same year,
she starred in tvN's romantic comedy series Heart to Heart, playing an aspiring actress.

In September 2015, Ahn's contract with BH Entertainment expired and she later signed with KeyEast.

In 2016, she starred in South Korea's first zombie movie, Train to Busan, playing a high school student and a loyal supporter of the baseball team. The film premiered in the Midnight Screenings section at the 2016 Cannes Film Festival on May 13, 2016 and later surpassed 11 million admissions. Despite the film's success, Ahn was criticized for her acting performance. Later that year, she featured in tvN's Korean remake of the American series Entourage, playing the love interest of Seo Kang-joon's character.

In 2017, Ahn starred in the thriller Single Rider alongside Lee Byung-hun and Gong Hyo-jin, where she received praise for her portrayal of a solitary teenager.

In 2018, Ahn acted as Anu, who is a lively and assertive Mongolian woman with Yeon Woo-jin as Hyuga, a pure-hearted Mongolian man on the short movie Anu and Hyuga, also known as Mongolian Love Story.

In 2019, Ahn was cast as one of the female lead roles in Welcome to Waikiki 2. In July 2019, she starred in a short film Memories, playing as a mysterious woman.

In 2022, Ahn starred in the drama Thirty-Nine as Kim So-won, younger sister of Kim Seon-woo and a pianist.

Discography

Filmography

Film

Television series

Hosting

Awards and nominations

References

External links

1992 births
Living people
People from Seoul
Actresses from Seoul
Singers from Seoul
Wonder Girls members
21st-century South Korean actresses
English-language singers from South Korea
Japanese-language singers of South Korea
JYP Entertainment artists
Mandarin-language singers of South Korea
South Korean female idols
South Korean female models
South Korean women pop singers
South Korean film actresses
South Korean television actresses
South Korean television presenters
South Korean women television presenters
South Korean child singers
Sunheung An clan